Michele or Michelle Lee may refer to:

Entertainment industry personalities
Michele Lee (born 1942), American actress and singer
Jennifer Michelle Lee (born 1971), American screenwriter and director at Disney
Michelle Lee (actress) (born 1978), American martial artist and stuntwoman
Michelle Lee (model) (born 1981), Miss World Australia runner-up, a/k/a Michelle Leslie
Michelle Lee (singer) (born 1991), South Korean singer and music instructor

Writers
Michelle Lee (editor) (born 1975), American editor in chief of Allure
Michelle Ye Hee Lee (born 1988), American journalist

Others
Michelle K. Lee (born 1965), American attorney and former head of Patent and Trademark Office
Michelle-Lee Ahye (born 1992), Trinidadian sprinter

Characters
Michelle Lee (NCIS), American special agent played by Liza Lapira